Stettfeld-Weiher station is a railway station in the municipality of Ubstadt-Weiher, located in the Karlsruhe district in Baden-Württemberg, Germany.

References

Railway stations in Baden-Württemberg
Buildings and structures in Karlsruhe (district)
Railway stations in Germany opened in 2019